Comico or Cómico (Spanish "comical" or "funny") may refer to:

Comico: The Comic Company, American comic company 1982–1997
Comico (NHN Japan), a webtoon portal owned by NHN Japan Corporation
Madrid Cómico, magazine 1891–1923 illustrated by Joaquín Xaudaró and others
Cómicos, 1954 Spanish drama film directed by Juan Antonio Bardem

See also
Comicó, village and municipality in Río Negro Province in Argentina, the name stressed on the final syllable and unrelated to "cómico", comical.